Nathan Overholser (born June 23, 1979) is an American former professional tennis player.

A left-hander from Okemos, Michigan, Overholser was Class A state high school singles champion in 1994 and played collegiate tennis for the University of Florida, where he earned three All-American selections.

Overholser was a wildcard pairing with Brandon Hawk in the 1997 US Open men's doubles main draw and the duo won through to the second round. He had an ATP Tour doubles main draw appearance in 2000 at the Indianapolis RCA Championships, partnering Todd Martin.

References

External links
 
 

1979 births
Living people
American male tennis players
Florida Gators men's tennis players
Tennis people from Michigan
Sportspeople from Okemos, Michigan